Belle Union is an unincorporated community in Jefferson Township, Putnam County, in the U.S. state of Indiana.

History
A post office was established at Belle Union in 1870, and remained in operation until it was discontinued in 1906. The name may be an amalgamation of the Bell family of settlers and the nearby Union Valley Baptist Church.

Geography

References

Unincorporated communities in Putnam County, Indiana
Unincorporated communities in Indiana